Geisha J. Williams (born Jimenez, c. 1961/1962) is a Cuban American businesswoman. She was the president and CEO of the Pacific Gas and Electric Company (PG&E) from March 2017 to January 13, 2019.

Early life
Williams was born Geisha J. Jimenez in Cuba. At the age of five, Geisha migrated to the US with her parents, after her father, a political prisoner in Cuba, was released from prison. Her father worked various jobs to provide for his family and went on to own their own grocery store.

She has a bachelor's degree in industrial engineering from the University of Miami and an MBA from Nova Southeastern University.

Career
After university, Williams worked for Florida Power & Light (FPL), starting as a residential energy auditor. Williams joined Pacific Gas and Electric Company (PG&E) in 2007.  

In March 2017, William became the first Latina chief executive officer of a Fortune 500 company.

She is a director at the Edison Electric Institute, the Institute of Nuclear Power Operations and the Association of Edison Illuminating Companies and is the board chairwoman for the Center for Energy Workforce Development.

Compensation criticism
In January 2019 Williams left PG&E as the company struggled to deal with legal and financial repercussions associated with a series of devastating California wildfires, which occurred in 2017 and 2018. Despite losing more than $6 billion, Williams received a pay raise of 8.12% in 2018.  PG&E filed for bankruptcy immediately after Williams' departure.

Williams is criticized for a $10mm+ pay packaging including $2.6mm in severance pay when she left PG&E as the company prepared to enter bankruptcy. The Los Angeles Times reported that, "Williams’ compensation encompassed numerous perks, including a car and driver, a $51,000 security system for her home, health club and “executive health” services worth $5,453 and financial services subsidized to the tune of $7,980."

In April 2019, California Governor Gavin Newsom expressed concern that new PG&E board members would have little knowledge of California, and may lack the expertise to safely run a utility.

Williams was succeeded by John Simon as interim CEO, then, in May 2019, Bill Johnson became CEO, garnering "more than twice the base salary" of Williams.

Personal life
Williams is married to Jay Williams, and they have two daughters.

She is a board director of the Bipartisan Policy Center and the a trustee of the California Academy of Sciences.

References

1960s births
Women corporate directors
American corporate directors
American women business executives
20th-century American businesspeople
21st-century American businesspeople
Living people
American chief executives of Fortune 500 companies
University of Miami College of Engineering alumni
Nova Southeastern University alumni
Cuban emigrants to the United States
American women chief executives
20th-century American businesswomen
21st-century American businesswomen
Pacific Gas and Electric Company people